Rachid Habchaoui (born 4 July 1950) is a retired Algerian long-distance runner who specialized in the 5000 metres and the 10,000 metres.

He competed in both the 5000 metres and the 10,000 metres at the 1980 Olympic Games, but failed to reach the final in either event. He won the bronze medal in the 10,000 metres at the 1979 African Championships, at the 1979 Mediterranean Games he won the 5000 metres silver and the 10,000 metres bronze, and at the 1981 Maghreb Championships he won 5000 and 10,000 metres gold medals.

His personal best times were 7.49.5 minutes in the 3000 metres, achieved in May 1979 in Naples; 13.35.8 minutes in the 5000 metres, achieved in 1979; and 28.24.0 minutes in the 10,000 metres, achieved in 1979.

Achievements

References

1950 births
Living people
Algerian male long-distance runners
Athletes (track and field) at the 1980 Summer Olympics
Olympic athletes of Algeria
Athletes (track and field) at the 1979 Mediterranean Games
Mediterranean Games silver medalists for Algeria
Mediterranean Games bronze medalists for Algeria
Mediterranean Games medalists in athletics
21st-century Algerian people
20th-century Algerian people